Kapatagan, officially the Municipality of Kapatagan (Maranao: Inged a Kapatagan;), is a 1st class municipality in the province of Lanao del Norte, Philippines. According to the 2020 census, it has a population of 62,571 people.

The town is famous for its diverse tourist spots such as big rice fields, majestic mountain views, and crystal clear rivers and lakes. Barangay Taguitic and Lapinig , located near the boundary with the neighboring Zamboanga del Sur province are also famous for its crab produce.

The municipality also boasts its successful sports program in basketball. The town is known in Lanao del Norte and even throughout Region X with a powerhouse basketball team in commercial and youth levels having participated in various semi-pro leagues, commercial tournaments and youth leagues throughout Mindanao

Etymology 
Kapatagan is derived from the Visayan word "patag" meaning plain or valley.

Geography
Kapatagan has a total land area of 25,048.41 hectares which include the area that is now being contested by the municipality of Lala with an approximate area of 759 hectares.

Topography
On the southern and eastern sides of the locality are mountains that serve as natural barriers protecting the Municipality from typhoons. Offsetting the mountain is the presence of flat coastal lands and valley. Kapatagan has some rolling plains.

It has five (5) major rivers that flow to Panguil Bay, namely: Maranding, Panoloon, Butadon, Kidalos, and Balili. These rivers sometimes, especially during the rainy season, overflow causing floods resulting in destruction and even death of farm and land animals.

The Cathedral Falls and Santa Cruz waterfalls are located at Barangays Cathedral Falls, Santa Cruz, and Waterfalls respectively. At present, the spring supplies water into Poblacion and some neighboring barangays.

Barangays

Kapatagan is politically subdivided into 33 barangays.

Climate

The Municipality has a tropical climate. Dry season starts during the month of October and ends in June. Wet season starts in the month of July and ends in December.

Demographics

Economy

The municipality is gaining economic favor mainly due to the funds released by some international organizations like GEM. Many companies have built some stores in Kapatagan to boost its economic growth like Mercury Drug, M Lhuillier Pawnshop, Cebuana Lhuillier, Palawan Pawnshop, Julie's Bakeshop, Prince Hypermart, and Gaisano Capital Mall.

Notable personalities
 Marlon Tapales - Professional Boxer

References

External links
   Kapatagan Profile at the DTI Cities and Municipalities Competitive Index
 [ Philippine Standard Geographic Code]
 
 Philippine Census Information
 Local Governance Performance Management System

Municipalities of Lanao del Norte